Community Memorial Hospital redirects to Community Memorial Hospital of San Beuenaventura

Several other hospitals share the name Community Memorial Hospital, including:

 Community Memorial Hospital (Ayer, Massachusetts)
 Froedtert Hospital grew through merger with Community Memorial Hospital of Menomonee Falls, Wisconsin
 Lakeridge Health Port Perry is an amalgam of several hospitals in Ontario, Canada, one having once been named Community Memorial Hospital Port Perry

References